Rubén Ramírez Hidalgo was the defending champion, but decided not to compete.

Pere Riba won the title, defeating Blaž Rola in the final, 7–5, 5–7, 6–2.

Seeds

Draw

Finals

Top half

Bottom half

References
 Main Draw
 Qualifying Draw

Visit Panama Cup - Singles
2014 Singles